The Gruta Rei do Mato (MG-3653) is a cave located  at the edge of the BR-040 highway, close to the off ramp to the city of Sete Lagoas, in Minas Gerais, Brazil. From Sete Lagoas the cave can easily be reached by bus, taxi or car.

Name
Gruta Rei do Mato means "Cave of the Forest King" in Portuguese. The name divides into Gruta (cave) and Rei do Mato (Forest King). According to several local sources, the "Rei do Mato" was a fugitive in either the Gruta Rei do Mato or another cave in the vicinity. According to the authors of Dona Brasil, he lived in a hut near the grotto.

Geology
The limestone area north of Belo Horizonte is called the Sete Lagoas Formation, in which the Lagoa Santa Karst developed. The area around Sete Lagoas has many cave systems, of which the Gruta Rei do Mato is the most widely known. The cave has four large chambers with numerous stalactites, stalagmites and rimstone dams. In the "Rarities Hall" are nearly identical parallel columns, formed by the calcium carbonate crystals of calcite.

In the nearby Parque da Cascata is a collapsed karst crater which can be recognised by some stalactites that are oriented horizontally as a result of the collapse. In a small cave next to the Gruta Rei do Mato, 4,000 to 6,000 year old cave paintings were discovered, as well as skeletal remains of the Xenorhinotherium bahiense, an extinct Pleistocene mammal. A replica of this animal can be found in the cave.

See also
 List of caves in Brazil

References

External links
 DonaBrasil.com on Gruta Rei do Mato
 Showcaves.com on Gruta Rei do Mato
 Pictures of Gruta Rei do Mato

Limestone caves
Show caves in Brazil
Tourist attractions in Minas Gerais
Caves of Minas Gerais